Bahadur Garh is a town and union council of Dera Ghazi Khan District in the Punjab province of Pakistan. It is located at 30°13'30N 70°39'5E and has an altitude of 116 metres (383 feet).

References

Populated places in Dera Ghazi Khan District
Union councils of Dera Ghazi Khan District